Rudolf van den Berg (born 6 January 1949, in Rotterdam) is a Dutch writer and director.

Van den Berg has been making films and documentaries for over thirty years now. Often praised and crowned, sometimes seriously criticized, Van den Berg's work has always succeeded in stirring passionate reactions.

His eighth feature film Tirza was released in September 2010. It is a heart-breaking, edgy story of a man in search of his missing daughter. In the desert of Namibia the father will be forced to confront the man who destroyed the life of his favorite child. The film was selected as the Dutch entry for the Best Foreign Language Film at the 83rd Academy Awards but it didn't make the final shortlist.

Süskind, a war story, written by Chris W. Mitchell and Van den Berg himself was released on 19 January 2012. Just as Tirza, it is also as a coproduction between Cadenza Films and FuWorks.

Filmography
1976 : Algerian Times (documentary; director)
1979 : The Alien's Place (documentary; director)
1982 : Sal Santen Rebel (documentary; writer/director)
1984 : Bastille (writer/director)
1985 : Stranger at Home (documentary; writer/director)
1987 : Looking for Eileen (writer/director)
1989 : Evenings (director)
1992 : De Johnsons (director)
1996 : The Cold Light of Day (director)
1997 : For My Baby (writer/director)
1998 : Oud Geld (TV) (director)
1998 : De Keerzijde (TV) (director)
2001 : Snapshots (writer/director)
2007 : Steel & Lavender (documentary; writer/director)
2008 : Schatz (documentary; writer/director)
2010 : Tirza (writer/director)
2012 : Süskind (writer/director)
2016 : A Real Vermeer (writer/director)

References

External links
Official Rudolf van den Berg website

1949 births
Living people
Dutch film directors
Golden Calf winners
Dutch male writers
Mass media people from Rotterdam
20th-century Dutch people
21st-century Dutch people